Tulu is a Dravidian language whose speakers are concentrated in Dakshina Kannada and in the southern part of Udupi of Karnataka in south-western India and also  in the northern parts of the Kasaragod district of Kerala. The native speakers of Tulu are referred to as Tuluva or Tulu people and the geographical area is unofficially called Tulu Nadu.

The Indian census report of 2011 reported a total of 1,846,427 native Tulu speakers in India. The 2001 census had reported a total of 1,722,768 native speakers. There is some difficulty in counting Tulu speakers who have migrated from their native region as they are often counted as Kannada speakers in Indian census reports.

Separated early from Proto-South Dravidian, Tulu has several features not found in Tamil–Kannada. For example, it has the pluperfect and the future perfect, like French or Spanish, but formed without an auxiliary verb.

Tulu is the primary spoken language in Tulu Nadu, consisting of the Dakshina Kannada and Udupi districts in the western part of Karnataka and the northern part of Kasaragod district of Kerala. A significant number of native Tulu speakers are found in Kalasa and Mudigere taluks of Chikkamagaluru district and also found in Thirthahalli taluks of Shivamogga district. Non-native speakers of Tulu include those who are residents in the Tulunadu region but who speak the Beary language, the Havyaka language and also Konkani and Koraga as their mother tongues. Apart from Tulu Nadu, a significant emigrant population of Tulu speakers are found in Maharashtra, Bangalore, Chennai, the English-speaking world, and the Gulf countries.

The various medieval inscriptions of Tulu from the 15th century are in the Tulu script. Two Tulu epics named Sri Bhagavato and Kaveri from the 17th century were also written in the same script. The Tulu language is known for its oral literature in the form of epic poems called pardana. The Epic of Siri and the legend of Koti and Chennayya belong to this category of Tulu literature.

Classification

Tulu belongs to the southern branch of the family of Dravidian languages. It descends directly from Proto-South Dravidian, which in turn descends directly from Proto-Dravidian, the hypothesized language from which all extant Dravidian languages ultimately descend. The Tulu language originates in the southern part of India.

Etymology

Linguist Purushottama Bilimale (ಪುರುಷೋತ್ತಮ ಬಿಳಿಮಲೆ) has suggested that the word  means 'that which is connected with water'. (jackfruit) means 'watery' in Tulu.

Official status 
Tulu is not an official language of India or any other country. Efforts are being made to include Tulu in the 8th Schedule of the Constitution. In December 2009, during the First Vishwa Tulu Sammelan organized at Ujire-Dharmastala, then Karnataka Chief Minister B. S. Yediyurappa promised to send a fresh proposal on including the Tulu language in the eighth schedule of the constitution. In August 2017, an online campaign was organized to include Tulu in 8th schedule of constitution In October 2017, when prime minister Narendra Modi, visited Dharmasthala Temple the same demand was presented in front of him. Similarly, in 2018, a Member of Parliament from the Kasargod constituency, P. Karunakaran, also raised the same demand for inclusion of Tulu language in the 8th schedule of the constitution. On 19 February 2020, Vedavyas Kamath who is a member of the Mangaluru (south) segment of the Legislative Assembly, submitted a memorandum to chief minister B. S. Yediyurappa and to the minister for tourism, Kannada and culture, C. T. Ravi, seeking official status for the Tulu language. In February 2020, another MLA from Moodbidri Umanath Kotian urged the state government to put pressure on the union government to add the Tulu language to the eighth schedule during the assembly session. In July 2021, members of the three main parties in Karnataka politics: BJP, Congress and Janata Dal (Secular), lent their support to the idea.

History
The oldest available inscriptions in Tulu are from the period between 7th and 8th century AD. These inscriptions are in the Tulu script and are found in areas in and around Barkur which was the capital of Tulu Nadu during the Vijayanagar period. Another group of inscriptions is found in the Ullur Subrahmanya Temple near Kundapura. Many linguists like S.U. Panniyadi and L. V. Ramaswami Iyer as well as P.S. Subrahmanya suggested that Tulu is among the oldest languages in the Dravidian family which branched independently from its Proto-Dravidian roots nearly 2500 years ago. This assertion is based on the fact that Tulu still preserves many aspects of the Proto-Dravidian language.

This dating of Tulu is also based on the fact that the region where Tulu is natively spoken was known to the ancient Tamils as Tulu Nadu. Also, the Tamil poet Mamular who belongs to the Sangam Age (200 BCE) describes Tulu Nadu and its dancing beauties in one of his poems. In the Kannada Halmidi inscriptions, one finds mention of the Tulu country as the kingdom of the Alupas. The region was also known to the Greeks of the 2nd century as Tolokoyra (Tulu Country). The Charition mime, a Greek play belonging to the 2nd century BC, has its plot centered around the coastal Karnataka, where Tulu is mainly spoken. The play is mostly in Greek, but the Indian characters in the play are seen speaking a language different from Greek. There is considerable ambiguity regarding the Indian language in the play, though all scholars agree the Indian language is Dravidian, there is considerable dispute over which form of it. Noted German Indologist E. Hultzsch (1857–1927) was the first to suggest that the language was Dravidian. The dispute regarding the language in the play is yet to be settled, but scholars agree that the dispute arises from the fact that Old Kannada, Old Tamil, and Tulu during the time when the play was written were perhaps dialectical variations of the same proto-language, and that over the years they evolved into their present forms as separate languages.

Status 
Found largely in Karnataka, it is spoken primarily within the Indian state. Dating back several hundred years, the language has developed numerous defining qualities. The Tulu people follow a saying which promotes leaving negative situations and finding newer, more positive ones. The language, however, is not as popular as others which means it could become endangered and extinct very soon. The influence of other mainstream languages is a present danger for the Tulu language. Today, it is spoken by nearly 1.8 million people around the globe. Large parts of the language are altered and changed constantly because it is commonly passed down through oral tradition. Oral traditions within Tulu have meant that certain phrases have not always maintained the same meaning or importance.

Geographic distribution

According to Malayalam works like the Keralolpathi, the region stretching from the Chandragiri river, now part of the Kasaragod district, Kerala, to Gokarna, now part of Uttara Kannada district of Karnataka, was ruled by the Alupas and was known as Alva Kheda. This kingdom was the homeland of the Tulu-speaking people. 
However, the present-day Tulu linguistic majority area is confined to the region of Tulu Nadu, which comprises the districts of part of Dakshina Kannada and Udupi in the Indian state of Karnataka and the northern part of Kasaragod district of Kerala up to the river Payaswani, also known as Chandragiri. The cities of Mangalore, Udupi and Kasaragod are the centres of Tulu culture.

Even today Tulu is widely spoken in the Dakshina Kannada, partially in Udupi district of Karnataka state and to some extent in Kasaragod of Kerala. Efforts are also being made to include Tulu in the list of official languages of India. As a whole, Tulu is largely contained to the southern part of India. The Indian state of Karnataka is where the language seems to thrive in the present day. Some of the major cities within the Tulu culture include Mangalore and Kasaragod.

Writing system

The various historical inscriptions of Tulu found around Barkur and Kundapura are in the Tulu-Tigalari script. Historically, Brahmins of Tulu Nadu and Havyaka Brahmins used the Tulu-Tigalari script to write Vedas and other Sanskrit works. The Tulu script is descended from the Brahmi through the Grantha script. It is a sister script of the Malayalam script. However, very few works written in vernacular languages like Kannada and Tulu are available. Hence, the Tulu script was employed by Tulu Brahmins to write Tulu and Kannada languages apart from the Kannada script. The National Mission for Manuscripts has conducted several workshops on this script with the help of a scholar, Keladi Gunda Jois. In the 18th century, the use of the Kannada script for writing Tulu and non-availability of print in the Tulu script contributed to the marginalization of the Ruling Tulu script. The script is studied by few scholars and manuscriptologists for research and religious purposes. The Kannada script has become the contemporary script for the Tulu language gradually. All contemporary works and literature are done in the Kannada script.

The Tulu alphabet resembles the Malayalam script in many ways. It is also similar to many characters found in the Tulu alphabet. This is from the same region in the state of Karnataka. The Tulu and Kannada alphabets include a stress on vowels with "a" and "o" sounds. Other vowels include sounds such as "au" "am" and "ah". Numerous consonants have their own origin from the Dravidian languages like "kha" "gha" "dha" and "jha". These are derived from the Tulu alphabet.

Dialects
Tulu language has four dialects, which are broadly similar, with slight variations.

The four dialects are:
Common Tulu
Spoken by the majority includes the Bunts, Billava, Mogaveera, Tulu Madivala (Madialnakl), Tulu Gowda, Kulala, Devadiga, Jogi, Padmashali communities and others. This is the dialect of commerce, trade and entertainment and is mainly used for inter-community communication. It is further subdivided into eight groups:
Northwest Tulu: spoken in Udupi
Central Tulu: spoken in Mangalore
Northeast Tulu: spoken in Karkala and Belthangady
Northern Tulu: spoken in Kundapura, also known as KundaTulu because of Kundagannada dialect influence
Southwest Tulu: spoken in Manjeshwar and Kasaragod, known as Kasaragod Tulu influencing Malayalam
Southcentral Tulu: spoken in Bantwal
Southeast Tulu: Spoken in Puttur Sullia and in some villages/Taluks of Coorg (Kodagu). 
Southern Tulu: spoken in South of Kasaragod and Payaswini (Chandragiri) river influencing Malayalam known as Thenkaayi Tulu
Brahmin Tulu
Spoken by the Tulu Brahmins who are subdivided into Shivalli Brahmins, Sthanika Brahmins and Tuluva Hebbars. It is more influenced by Sanskrit.
Jain dialect
Spoken by the Tulu Jains. It is a dialect where the initial letters 'T' and 'S' have been replaced by the letter 'H'.
Adivasi dialect
Spoken by the Koraga, Mansa, and other tribals of Tulu Nadu

Phonology

Vowels 
Five short and five long vowels (a, ā, e, ē, u, ū, i, ī, o, ō) are common in Dravidian languages. Like Kodava Takk (and also like Konkani and Sinhala), Tulu also has an  like vowel, generally occurring word-finally which is from the old ai. The Kannada script does not have a symbol to specifically represent this vowel, which is often written as a normal e. For example, the first person singular form and the third person singular masculine of a verb are spelled identically in all tenses, both ending in e, but are pronounced differently: the terminating e in the former sounds nearly like ‘a’ in the English word ‘man’ ("I make"), while that in the latter like ‘e’ in ‘men’ ("he makes").

In his grammar of 1932, S. U. Paniyadi used a special vowel sign to denote Tulu /ɛ/ in the Kannada script: according to Bhat, he used two s for this purpose (usually, a  means the crest that a Kannada character like  has), and the same convention was adopted by Upadhyaya in his 1988 Tulu Lexicon. The long counterpart of this vowel occurs in some words. In all dialects, the pair /e/ and /ɛ/ contrasts.

Additionally, like Kodava Takk and Toda, and like Malayalam  and Tamil , Tulu has an -like vowel (or schwa ) as a phoneme, which is romanized as ŭ (ISO), ɯ, or u̥. Both J. Brigel and A. Männer say that it is pronounced like e in the French je. Bhat describes this phoneme as /ɯ/. However, if it is like Malayalam "half-u",  or  may be a better description. /ɛ/ formed from previous ai and previous /u/ split into modern /u, ɯ/; long versions of /ɛ, ɯ/ are extremely restricted. In the Kannada script, Brigel and Männer used a virama (halant), to denote this vowel.

Consonants 
The following are consonant phonemes in Tulu:

Aspirated consonants are sometimes used in the Brahmin dialect, but are not phonemic. In the Koraga and Holeya dialects, s  and ś  merge with c  (the Koraga dialect of the Tulu language is different from the Koraga language). Word-initial consonant clusters are rare and occur mainly in Sanskrit loanwords.

Grammar

Morphology
Tulu has five parts of speech: nouns (substantives and adjectives), pronouns, numerals, verbs, and particles.

Substantives have three grammatical genders (masculine, feminine, and neuter), two numbers (singular and plural), and eight cases (nominative, genitive, dative, accusative, locative, ablative or instrumental, communicative, and vocative). According to Bhat, Tulu has two distinct locative cases. The communicative case is used with verbs like tell, speak, ask, beseech, inquire, and denotes at whom a message, an inquiry, or a request is aimed, as in "I told him." or "I speak to them." It is also used to denote the relationship with whom it is about, in a context like "I am on good terms with him." or "I have nothing against him." Bhat calls it the sociative case. It is somewhat similar to the comitative case, but different in that it denotes communication or relationship, not physical companionship. The nominative case is unmarked, while the remaining cases are expressed by different suffixes.

The following table shows the declension of a noun, based on Brigel and Bhat (u̥ used by Brigel and ɯ used by Bhat are both shown as ŭ for clarity): when two forms are given, the one in parentheses is by Bhat, and the other is by Brigel. Some of these differences may be dialectal variations.

The personal pronouns are irregularly inflected:  'I' becomes yen- in oblique cases. Tulu makes the distinction between the inclusive and exclusive we (see Clusivity: Dravidian languages):  'we (including you)' as opposed to  'we (not including you)'. For verbs, this distinction does not exist. The personal pronouns of the second person are  'you (singular)' and  'you (plural)'. Three genders are distinguished in the third person, as well as proximate and remote forms. For example,  'he (proximate)',  'he (remote)'. The suffix -rŭ makes a polite form of personal pronouns, as in  'you (respectfully)',  'he (remote; respectfully)'.
Postpositions are used usually with a noun in the genitive case, as in  'on the hill'.

Tulu verbs have three forms: active, causative, and reflexive (or middle voice).
They conjugate for person, number, gender, tense (present, past, pluperfect, future, and future perfect), mood (indicative, imperative, conditional, infinitive, potential, and subjunctive), and polarity (positive and negative).

Syntax 
Each sentence is composed of a subject and a predicate and every sentence is a full speech or thought in words. There is both singular and plural while being expressed in first through third person. There are several exceptions to each of these depending on the instance. For example: the verb has to be in a plural style if there are numerous nominatives within a sentence or of different genders that agree with the previous sentence. The verb may also be omitted in some sentences. Present tense and past tense may change and their perception.

Written literature
The written literature of Tulu is not as large as the literature of other literary Dravidian languages such as Tamil. Nevertheless, Tulu is one of only five literary Dravidian languages, the other four being Tamil, Telugu, Kannada and Malayalam. The earliest available Tulu literature that survives to this date is the Tulu translation of the great Sanskrit epic of Mahabharata called . It was written by Arunabja (1657 AD), a poet who lived in Kodavur near Udupi around the late 14th to early 15th century AD.
Other important literary works in Tulu are:
 Devi Mahatmyam's 1200 AD – Tulu translation
 Sri Bhagavata 1626 AD – written by Vishnu Tunga
 Kaveri (1391 AD)

This script was mainly used to write religious and literary works in Sanskrit.  Even today the official script of the eight Tulu monasteries (Ashta Mathas of Udupi) founded by Madhvacharya in Udupi is Tulu. The pontiffs of the monasteries write their names using this script when they are appointed.

Modern-day Tulu literature is written using the Kannada script. Mandara Ramayana is the most notable piece of modern Tulu literature. Written by Mandara Keshava Bhatt, it received the Sahitya Akademi Award for best poetry. Madipu, Mogaveera, Saphala and Samparka are popular Tulu periodicals published from Mangalore. The Tulu Sahitya Academy, established by the state government of Karnataka in 1994, as also the Kerala Tulu Academy established by the Indian State Government of Kerala in Manjeshwaram in 2007, are important governmental organisations that promote Tulu literature. Nevertheless, there are numerous organisations spread all over the world with significant Tulu-migrated populations that contribute to Tulu literature. Some notable contributors to Tulu literature are Kayyar Kinhanna Rai, M. K. Seetharam Kulal, Amruta Someshwara, B. A. Viveka Rai, Kedambadi Jattappa Rai, Venkataraja Puninchattaya, Paltadi Ramakrishna Achar, Dr. Sunitha M. Shetty, Dr. Vamana Nandavara, Sri. Balakrishna Shetty Polali.

Oral traditions
The oral traditions of Tulu are one of the major traditions that greatly show the finer aspects of the language. The following are various forms of Tulu oral tradition and literature.

Paddanas: A form of oral epic poem sung in a highly stylised manner during the Hindu rituals of Bhuta Kola and Nagaradhane, which are peculiar to the Tulu people. These Paddanas are mostly legends about gods or historical personalities among the people. The longest of them being Siri Paddana, which is about a woman called Siri who shows strength and integrity during adverse times and in turn attains divinity. The Paddana greatly depicts the independent nature of the Tulu womenfolk. The entire Paddana was written down by Finnish scholar Lauri Honko of the University of Turku and it falls four lines short of Homer's Iliad.
Riddles: They are another important aspect of Tulu oral traditions. These riddles are largely tongue twisting and mostly deal with kinship and agriculture.
Bhajans: Bhajans sung in numerous temples across the Tulu region are varied and are dedicated to various gods and goddesses. Most of these are of the Hindu tradition, others being Jain. They are sung in both the Carnatic style as well a style similar to what is used in Yakshagana.
Kabitol: Songs sung during the cultivation of crops, the traditional occupation of the people. O Bele is considered the finest among them.

Theatre

Theatre in the form of the traditional Yakshagana, prevalent in coastal Karnataka and northern Kerala has greatly preserved the finer aspects of the Tulu language. Yakshagana which is conducted in Tulu is very popular among the Tuluva people. It can also be seen as a form of temple art, as there are many Yakshagana groups that are attached to temples, for example that of Kateel Durga Parameshwari Temple as also the Udupi Krishna Temple.

Presently, eight professional Yakshagana troupes perform Tulu-language Yakshagana not only during the Yakshagana season but also during the off-season in various places in Karnataka and outside. In Mumbai, Tulu Yakshagana is very popular among the Tulu audiences. More than 2,000 Yakshagana artistes take part in the performance in various places in Mumbai annually. Notable performers include Kalladi Koraga Shetty, Pundur Venkatraja Puninchathaya, Guru Bannanje Sanjiva Suvarna and Pathala Venkatramana Bhat.

Tulu plays are among the major entertainment for admirers of art and culture in Tulu Nadu. Tulu plays, generally centered on the comic genre, are very popular in Mumbai and Bangalore outside Tulu Nadu.

Tulu cinema

The Tulu cinema industry is fairly small; it produces around five films annually. The first film, Enna Thangadi, was released in 1971. Usually these films are released in theatres across the Tulu Nadu region and on DVD. The critically acclaimed film Suddha won the award for Best Indian Film at the Osian's Cinefan Festival of Asian and Arab Cinema in New Delhi in 2006. As of 2015, Oriyardori Asal (2011) has been the most commercially successful Tulu film. Chaali Polilu is the longest-running film in Tulu film history, as well as the highest-grossing film in the Tulu film industry. It has successfully completed 470 days at PVR Cinemas in Mangalore. The 2014 film Madime was reported to be remade in Marathi, thereby becoming the first Tulu film to be remade in another language. Shutterdulai was the first remake in Tulu cinema. Eregla Panodchi is the second remake in Tulu cinemas. A suit for damages of Rs. 25 lakh was filed against the makers of the Telugu film Brahmotsavam for copying the first 36 seconds of the song  by Dr. Vamana Nandaavara found in the Deepanalike CD composed for the Siri channel. Prajavani reported that with its dubbing rights sold to Hindi for Rs. 21 lakh, the 2018 movie Umil became the first Tulu movie to achieve the feat. Ashwini Kotiyan (Chaya Harsha) became the first female director in the Tulu industry after directing and releasing her first movie Namma Kudla. Brahmashree Narayana Guruswamy released on 2 May 2014 was the 50th Tulu film. Panoda Bodcha marked the 75th release anniversary of a Tulu film. The 100th Tulu movie Karne was released on 16 November 2018.

Guddada Bhootha, a television series aired in 1990, was one of the successful ventures of Tulu entertainment. This mini-series has a suspense storyline based on a Tulu drama, showing the country life of Tulu Nadu region of India. It was one of the popular TV series of that time. This series has a very famous title song Dennana Dennana sung by B. R. Chaya. This song along with the music were used in Rangitaranga, a Kannada movie.

Centres of Tulu study and research

Tulu as a language continues to thrive in coastal Karnataka and Kasaragod in Kerala. Karnataka Tulu Sahitya Academy, an institute established by the state government of Karnataka in 1994, has introduced Tulu as a language in schools around coastal Karnataka, including Alva's High School, Moodbidri; Dattanjaneya High School, Odiyoor; Ramakunjeshwara English-medium High School, Ramakunja; and Vani Composite Pre-University College, Belthangady. Initially started in 16 schools, the language is now taught in over 33 schools, of which 30 are in Dakshina Kannada district. More than 1500 students have opted to study this language.

The Government of Kerala established the Kerala Tulu Academy in 2007. The academy focuses on the retrieval and propagation of Tulu language and culture in Kerala through various activities such as organising seminars and publishing Tulu periodicals, etc. The academy is based in Hosangadi, Manjeshwar in Kasaragod.

Tulu is also taught as a language at the post-graduate level in Mangalore University, and there is a dedicated department for Tulu studies, translation and research at Dravidian University in Kuppam Andhra Pradesh.The Government Degree College at Kasaragod in Kerala also introduced a certificate course in Tulu for the academic year 2009–2010. It has also introduced Tulu as an optional subject in its Kannada post-graduation course. It has adopted syllabi from the books published by the Tulu Sahitya Academy.

German missionaries Kammerer and Männer were the first people to conduct research on the language. Kammerer collected about 3,000 words and their meanings before his death. Later his work was carried on by Männer, who completed the research and published the first dictionary of the Tulu language in 1886 with the help of the then-Madras government. The effort was incomplete, as it did not cover all aspects of the language. The Govinda Pai Research Centre at MGM College, Udupi started an 18-year Tulu lexicon project in the year 1979.

Different dialects, special vocabularies used for different occupational activities, rituals, and folk literature in the forms of Paād-danāas were included in this project. The Centre has also released a six-volume, trilingual, modestly priced Tulu-Kannada-English lexicon. The Tulu lexicon was awarded the Gundert Award for the best dictionary in the country in 1996. In September 2011, the Academic Council of Mangalore University accepted a proposal, to allow the university and the colleges affiliated to it to offer certificates, diplomas and postgraduate diploma courses in Tulu, both in regular and correspondence modes

See also
Gokak agitation
List of Tulu films
Aliya Kattu

Notes

References

Further reading 
 Caldwell, R., A Comparative Grammar of the Dravidian or South-Indian family of languages, London: Harrison, 1856.; Reprinted London, K. Paul, Trench, Trubner & co., ltd., 1913; rev. ed. by J. L. Wyatt and T. Ramakrishna Pillai, Madras, University of Madras, 1961, reprint Asian Educational Services, 1998. 
 C. (1875). A Comparative Grammar of the Dravidian or South-Indian family of languages. London: Trübner and Co., Ludgate Hill.
 Danielou, Alain (1985), Histoire de l'Inde, Fayard, Paris. 
 Hall, Edith (2002), "The singing actors of antiquity" in Pat Easterling & Edith Hall, ed., Greek and Roman Actors: Aspects of an Ancient Profession, Cambridge University Press, Cambridge. 
 Lauri Honko, Textualisation of Oral Epics. 
 William Pais, Land Called South Canara. 
 Bhat, S.L. A Grammar of Tulu: a Dravidian language. 
 Männer, A. Tuḷu-English dictionary, Mangalore: Printed at the Basel Mission Press 1886
 Männer, A. English-Tuḷu dictionary, Mangalore: Printed at the Basel Mission Press 1888
 Brigel, J. A Grammar of the Tulu language, Mangalore, published by C. Stolz, Basel Mission Book & Tract Depository, 1872
 
 Bhat D. N. S. (1967). Descriptive analysis of Tulu. Poona: Deccan College Postgraduate and Research Institute.
 Vinson, Julien (1878), Maisonneuve et cie., Paris
 Burnell, Arthur Coke (1874), Elements of South-Indian Palæography from the Fourth to the Seventeenth Century A.D., Trübner & Co.
 Krishnamurti, Bhadriraju (2003), The Dravidian Languages, Cambridge University Press. 
 G., L. R. (2013). Elements of comparative philology. Place of publication not identified: Hardpress Ltd.
 Bhatt, S. L. (2005). A grammar of Tulu: a Dravidian language. Thiruvananthapuram: Dravidian linguistics association.
 Goddard, C. (2009). The languages of East and Southeast Asia: an introduction. Oxford: Oxford Univ. Press.
 Padmanabha, Kekunnaya. K. (1994). A comparative study of Tulu dialects. Udupi.
 Narayana, S. B. (1967). Descriptive analysis of Tulu. Poona: Deccan College Postgraduate and Research Institute.
 Upadhyaya, U. P. (n.d.). Tulu Lexicon: Tulu-Kannada-English Dictionary. Udupi.
 Aiyar, L. R. (1936). Materials for a sketch of Tulu phonology. Lahore.

External links

 Official Website of Karnataka Government's Tulu Academy
 Online Tulu Dictionary
 Tuluver.com
 Kopparige Tulu Dictionary
 Tulu Language and Alphabets

 
Dravidian languages
Udupi
Culture of Kasaragod district
Agglutinative languages
Vowel-harmony languages
Dakshina Kannada district
Tulu Nadu
Culture of Tulu Nadu